Hasmi Hashim (born 19 March 1976 in Batu Pahat, Johore), is a Malaysian politician, writer, lyricist, script-writer and poet.

Awards
Hasmi received a variety of industry awards including: 
 Creative Writing (Selangor Young Talent's Award 2010)
 Best Song - Awan Nano (Anugerah Juara Lagu 2011)

References

1976 births
Living people
People from Johor
Malaysian writers
Malaysian poets
Malaysian people of Malay descent
Malaysian Muslims
People's Justice Party (Malaysia) politicians
Malay-language poets
Malaysian lyricists
Malaysian screenwriters